The Association of Research Libraries (ARL) is a nonprofit organization of 127 research libraries at comprehensive, research institutions in Canada and the United States. ARL member libraries make up a large portion of the academic and research library marketplace, spending more than $1.8 billion every year on information resources and actively engaging in the development of new models of scholarly communications.

ARL co-founded an affiliate organization, the Coalition for Networked Information (CNI), in 1990. CNI is a joint program of ARL and EDUCAUSE, a nonprofit association whose mission is to advance higher education through the use of information technology. ARL is also a member of the Library Copyright Alliance, a consortium of major library associations that have joined forces to address copyright issues affecting libraries and their patrons.

History 1932–1962
The Association of Research Libraries held its first meeting in Chicago on December 29, 1932. At that time, its membership included 42 major university and research libraries. This first meeting was primarily organizational. The prepared constitution and bylaws were accepted and each library adopted a constitution that stated, "the object shall be, by cooperative effort, to develop and increase the resources and usefulness of the research collections in American libraries." Donald B. Gilchrist was elected as Executive Secretary. The Advisory Committee members included J. Christian Bay (John Crerar Library), James T. Gerould (Princeton University), Harold L. Leupp (University of California – Berkeley), C. C. Williamson (Columbia University), and Phineas L. Windsor (Illinois University).

The first venture to be undertaken by ARL was a project for the collection of data regarding manuscript collections. This project had little support and was relatively short-lived.  However, the second project, the annual listings of the titles of the PhD theses was a significant contribution to the profession. The first volume of Doctoral Dissertations Accepted by American Universities was compiled by ARL and was published by H. W. Wilson in 1933.  This series of publications would become the predecessor of what is now Dissertation Abstracts. Passed into law in 1933, the National Industrial Recovery Act allowed trade associations and industry representatives to draft industrial codes of fair competition.  In order to encourage the preservation of these records, ARL published Address List of Local Code Authorities under N.R.A.: 1933-1935 in 1933 which had been prepared by the National Recovery Administration for the Joint Committee on Materials for Research established by the American Council of Learned Societies and the National Research Council. Two new members were added to ARL in 1936; Grosvenor Library (Buffalo) and New York University. The National Archives had expressed interest in joining but rejected the subsequent invitation.

ARL initiated two projects in 1937; publication of the Library of Congress catalog and an investigation into the pricing policy of the Wilson Company. In December 1937, Keyes Metcalf (Harvard University) succeeded Gilchrist as Executive Secretary. Gilchrist continued to edit Doctoral Dissertations Accepted by American Universities and serve on the Wilson Pricing Policy Committee. The University of California – Los Angeles joined the ARL in 1937. Louisiana State University joined ARL in 1938. Keyes's term ended in 1940 and he was replaced by Paul N. Rice (New York Public Library).

In a meeting in January 1942, a proposal for the division of acquisition responsibility was presented.  Rice formed a Committee on Postwar Competition in Book Purchases. Members of this committee included Archibald MacLeish (Library of Congress), Keyes D. Metcalf, and Robert Downs (future Director of Libraries at the University of Illinois). This program served as a pilot project for the Farmington Plan. As part of the Library of Congress project, the ARL sponsored the publication of A Catalog of Books Represented by L.C. Printed Cards in 1942.

A two-day meeting was held in March 1944 to discuss a multitude of issues. Resulting from the meeting were a number of committees: Committee on Division of Responsibility for the Acquisition and Recording of Research Materials, Committee to Investigate the Wilson Proposal for Publication of LC Catalog Cards in Book Form, Committee on Reprinting the British Museum Catalog, Committee on Securing Complete Files of Foreign Documents in Certain Designated American Libraries, Committee on Standards for Graduate Colleges, Committee on Statistics of Library Holdings, Committee to Study Plans of Cancellation of Library Discards, Joint Committee on Government Documents, and Joint Committee on Cooperative Buying of Chinese Materials. In 1946, Charles E. David (University of Pennsylvania) was elected Executive Secretary.

The Farmington Plan was initiated in January 1948 covering limited to monographs published in France, Sweden, and Switzerland by 52 cooperating libraries. The overhead expenses were paid for by a grant from the Carnegie Corporation. Also in 1948, ARL Minutes were submitted for publication in College & Research Libraries for the first time.  
 
Robert A. Miller was elected Executive Secretary in December 1951.  The Foreign Newspaper Microfilm project was initiated in January 1956. It has 46 subscribers and a first year budget of $14,000.  William S. Dix, the 6th Executive Secretary, was elected in 1957. His term lasted only 2 years as he was elected Chairman of the U.S. National Commission for UNESCO in 1959.  Stephen A. McCarthy was elected in 1960.

On December 5, 1961, the ARL was incorporated under the laws of the District of Columbia. In May 1962, the National Science Foundation approved a 2-year grant of $58,350 towards the establishment of a full-time ARL Secretariat. The June 1962 invitation meeting brought the total number of ARL members to 72.  In 1963, ARL assumed responsibility of publishing annual library statistics.

Leadership

Executive Secretaries 1932–1962

Executive Directors 1963–present

Presidents 1962–present

Members 
The association boasts members in both Canada and the United States. Currently, the following institutions are members of the organization.

 Arizona State University
 Atlanta University Center
 Auburn University
 Boston College
 Boston Public Library
 Boston University
 Brigham Young University
 Brown University
 Case Western Reserve University
 Center for Research Libraries
 Colorado State University
 Columbia University
 Cornell University
 Dartmouth College
 Duke University
 Emory University
 Florida State University
 George Washington University
 Georgetown University
 Georgia Tech
 Harvard University
 Howard University
 Indiana University Bloomington
 Iowa State University
 Johns Hopkins University
 Kent State University
 Library of Congress
 Louisiana State University
 Massachusetts Institute of Technology
 McGill University
 McMaster University
 Michigan State University
 United States National Agricultural Library
 United States National Library of Medicine
 New York Public Library
 New York University
 North Carolina State University
 Northwestern University
 Ohio State University
 Ohio University
 Oklahoma State University–Stillwater
 Pennsylvania State University
 Princeton University
 Purdue University
 Queen's University at Kingston
 Rice University
 Rutgers University
 Simon Fraser University
 Smithsonian Institution
 Southern Illinois University Carbondale
 Stony Brook University
 Syracuse University
 Temple University
 Texas A&M University
 Texas State University
 Texas Tech University
 Tulane University
 University of Alabama
 University at Albany, SUNY
 University of Alberta
 University of Arizona
 University of British Columbia
 University at Buffalo
 University of Calgary
 University of California, Berkeley
 University of California, Davis
 University of California, Irvine
 University of California, Los Angeles
 University of California, Riverside
 University of California, San Diego
 University of California, Santa Barbara
 University of California, Santa Cruz
 University of Chicago
 University of Cincinnati
 University of Colorado Boulder
 University of Connecticut
 University of Delaware
 University of Florida
 University of Georgia
 University of Guelph
 University of Hawaiʻi at Mānoa
 University of Houston
 University of Illinois at Chicago
 University of Illinois Urbana-Champaign
 University of Iowa
 University of Kansas
 University of Kentucky
 Université Laval
 University of Louisville
 University of Manitoba
 University of Maryland, College Park
 University of Massachusetts Amherst
 University of Miami
 University of Michigan
 University of Minnesota
 University of Missouri
 University of Nebraska–Lincoln
 University of New Mexico
 University of North Carolina at Chapel Hill
 University of North Texas
 University of Notre Dame
 University of Oklahoma
 University of Oregon
 University of Ottawa
 University of Pennsylvania
 University of Pittsburgh
 University of Rochester
 University of Saskatchewan
 University of South Carolina
 University of Southern California
 University of Texas at Austin
 University of Tennessee
 University of Toronto
 University of Utah
 University of Virginia
 University of Washington
 University of Waterloo
 University of Western Ontario
 University of Wisconsin–Madison
 Vanderbilt University
 Virginia Commonwealth University
 Virginia Tech
 Washington State University
 Washington University in St. Louis
 Wayne State University
 Yale University
 York University

See also
 American Library Association
 International Federation of Library Associations
 Association of College and Research Libraries
 Scholarly Publishing and Academic Resources Coalition

References

Library associations in the United States
Canadian library associations